A deckhead is the underside of a deck in a ship. It bears the same relationship to a compartment on the deck below as does the ceiling to the room of a house.

References

Nautical terminology